Antiserum is a blood serum containing monoclonal or polyclonal antibodies that is used to spread passive immunity to many diseases via blood donation (plasmapheresis). For example, convalescent serum, passive antibody transfusion from a previous human survivor, used to be the only known effective treatment for ebola infection with a high success rate of 7 out of 8 patients surviving.

Antisera are widely used in diagnostic virology laboratories. The most common use of antiserum in humans is as antitoxin or antivenom to treat envenomation.

Serum therapy, also known as serotherapy, describes the treatment of infectious disease using the serum of animals that have been immunized against the specific organisms or their product, to which the disease is supposedly referable.

History 
In 1890, Emil Behring and Kitasato Shibasaburō published their first paper on serum therapy.

Behring had pioneered the technique, using guinea pigs to produce serum. Based on his observation that people who survived infection with the diphtheria bacterium never became infected again, he discovered that the body continually produces an antitoxin, which prevents survivors of infections from being infected again with the same agent.

It was necessary for Behring to immunize larger animals in order to produce enough serum to protect humans, because the amount of antiserum produced by guinea pigs was too little to be practical. Horses proved to be the best serum producer, as the serum of other large animals is not concentrated enough, and horses were not believed to carry any diseases that could be transferred to humans.

Due to the First World War, a large number of horses were needed for military purposes. It was difficult for Behring to find enough German horses for his serum facility. He chose to obtain horses from Eastern European countries, mostly Hungary and Poland. Because of Behring's limited financial resources, most horses he selected had been intended for slaughter; however, the usefulness of the animal to others had no influence on the production of  serum. Serum horses were calm, well-mannered, and in good health. Age, breed, height, and color were irrelevant.

Horses were transported from Poland or Hungary to the Behring facilities in Marburg, in the west-central part of Germany. Most of the horses were transported by rail and treated like any other freight load. During the interminable border crossing, horses were left at the mercy of the weather. Once the horses arrived in Marburg, they had three to four weeks to recover in a quarantine facility, where data on them was recorded. They had to be in perfect medical condition for the immunization, and the quarantine facility ensured that they were free of microbes which could infect the other horses. In the Behring facilities, the horses were viewed as life savers; therefore, they were well treated. A few of the individual horses used for serum production were named, and celebrated for their service to medicine, both human and non-human.

At the end of the 19th century, every second child in Germany was infected with diphtheria, the most frequent cause of death in children up to 15 years. In 1891 Emil Behring saved the life of a young girl with diphtheria by injecting antiserum for the first time in history. Serum horses proved to be saviors of diphtheria-infected people. Subsequently, treatment of tetanus, rabies, and snake venom developed, and  proactive protective vaccination against diphtheria and other microbial diseases began.

In 1901, Behring won the first Nobel Prize in Medicine for his work in the study of diphtheria.

Serum therapy became increasingly prevalent for infectious diseases, and was even used to treat patients during the influenza pandemic in 1918. Its uses were then quickly expanded to also treat diseases such as polio, measles, pneumococcus, Haemophilus influenza B, and meningococcus. In the 1920s, Michael Heidelberger and Oswald Avery proved that antibodies were proteins that targeted the capsule of the virus or bacteria.

The discovery of antibiotics in the 1940s diminished interest in treating bacterial infections with antiserum, but its use for viral infections continued with the development of ethanol fractionation of blood plasma (which allowed for purified antibodies), discovered by Edwin Cohn. Antisera were developed to prevent and/or treat diphtheria, tetanus, Hepatitis B, rabies, varicella zoster virus, cytomegalovirus, and botulinum. However, these were not widely used.

In 1984, Milstein and Köhler won a Nobel Prize for their paper that described their method for making murine monoclonal antibodies by immortalizing B cells as hybridomas. Another breakthrough occurred in 2003. A new technology allowed for heavy and light chain immunoglobulin genes to be amplified from human B cells and cloned into expression vectors. In 2008, this method was refined with a greater ability to sort cells and clone, which led to the discovery of more human monoclonal antibodies.

In 1996, the FDA approved the use of RSV-IGIV (Respigam), a polyclonal antibody drug to inhibit respiratory syncytial virus (RSV) for high-risk newborns. This was considered a breakthrough, as the clinical trial was proven to reduce infant hospitalizations by 41% and length of hospital stays by 53%. After two years the product demand began to exceed the supply of plasma and Synagis, the first humanized monoclonal antibody was approved in its place. Monoclonal antibodies became advantageous due to their decreased variability in quality, a decreased risk of bloodborne diseases, and increased potency. This enabled a large expansion of the usages of antiserum and opened the door for the treatment of autoimmune diseases.

The past 30 years have seen the transformation of how chronic and autoimmune diseases (e. g. cancer, ulcerative colitis) are treated, with 30 drugs—28 of which for chronic conditions—with monoclonal antibodies being approved. Monoclonal antibodies are currently being researched to treat viral diseases without vaccines, such as HIV, SARS, and MERS.

Modern use

For a more complete list of monoclonal antibodies visit list of therapeutic monoclonal antibodies.

Monoclonal antibodies are used to treat both acute and chronic conditions. Acute conditions may include, but are not limited to Ebola virus, envenomation (e. g. snake bites), and anthrax infection. Chronic conditions may include, but are not limited to rheumatoid arthritis, ulcerative colitis, and lupus.

There are four main types of monoclonal antibodies. They are murine, chimeric, humanized, and human.

Murine monoclonal antibodies are identified with the suffix "-omab". They originate from a murine animal and can trigger allergic reactions in humans. An example of a murine monoclonal antibody is Blinatumomab, which is used to treat acute lymphoblastic leukemia.

Chimeric monoclonal antibodies are identified with the suffix "-ximab". They originate partially from a murine animal and partially from a human. An example of a chimeric monoclonal antibody is Infliximab, which is used to treat Crohn disease.

Humanized monoclonal antibodies are identified with the suffix "-zumab". They mostly originate from a human but differ in the component that attaches to its target. An example of a humanized monoclonal antibody is Crizanlizumab, which treats sickle cell disease.

Human monoclonal antibodies are identified with the suffix "-umab". They originate from a human. An example of a human monoclonal antibody is Ustekinumab, which treats psoriasis.

During the early stages of the COVID-19 pandemic, reliable treatment options had not yet been found or approved. In reaction, convalescent blood plasma was considered as a possibility and is used as a treatment option at least for severe cases. In May 2021, India was one of the first major country to remove plasma from its national COVID-19 guideline. This was after public criticism on the lack of its effectiveness and health systems burdening from leading Indian scientists including Shahid Jameel, Soumyadeep Bhaumik, Gagandeep Kang, Soumitra Pathare, and others. The World Health Organization recommended against use of plasma in COVID-19 in December 2021.

Monoclonal antibodies (Casirivimab/imdevimab) were developed for the treatment of COVID-19.

On June 7, 2021, the FDA approved Aducanumab, the first Alzheimer's drug in 20 years.

How it works
Antibodies in the antiserum bind the infectious agent or antigen. The immune system then recognizes foreign agents bound to antibodies and triggers a more robust immune response.  The use of antiserum is particularly effective against pathogens which are capable of evading the immune system in their unstimulated state but are not robust enough to evade the stimulated immune system.  The existence of antibodies to the agent depends on an initial survivor whose immune system, by chance, discovered a counteragent to the pathogen or a host species which carries the pathogen but does not experience its effects. Further stocks of antiserum can then be produced from the initial donor or from a donor organism that is inoculated with the pathogen and cured by some stock of pre-existing antiserum. Diluted snake venom is often used as an antiserum to give passive immunity to snake venom itself.

Horses that were infected by a pathogen were vaccinated thrice in increasing sizes of the dose. The time between each vaccination varied from each horse and its health condition. Normally the horses needed a few weeks to produce the serum in the blood after the last vaccination. Even though they tried to empower the immune system of the horses during this immunization with painstaking care, most of the horses experienced appetite loss, fever, and in worse cases shock and dyspnea.

The highest immunization risk for horses was the production of antiserum for snake venom.

The horse was immunized with all types of snake poison at the same time because it was not always possible to know by which snake species a person had been bitten. Therefore, the serum had to immunize the subject against the venom of every snake species.

In order to find the moment when most antitoxins in the blood cells of the horses is produced, frequent blood samples were taken from the horses. At the point when the highest amount of antibodies were produced, five liters of blood, a tenth of the blood volume of a horse, were taken through a cannula.

The blood was collected in a glass cylinder and brought to the laboratory in the Behring facilities. Above the rouleaux formation which contained the red blood cells, the serum was visible. The color of the serum varied from milky to brown.

Concentration and sterility of the serum were checked carefully, and the serum was filtered many times. Protein content was decreased in order to use the serum for humans.

After the blood sampling, the horses could rest for three to four weeks and received extra food to recover the blood loss. In this period the horses were especially weak and prone to disease and infection.

Within a few years, with experience and observation of the horses, a rouleaux formation of the blood sample was placed back into the animal's body. This procedure is called plasmapheresis.

References

External links
 

Blood
Immune system